The River Tour was a concert tour featuring Bruce Springsteen and the E Street Band that took place in 1980 and 1981, beginning concurrently with the release of Springsteen's album The River.

Itinerary
The first leg of the tour took place in arenas in the United States, comprising 46 shows beginning on October 3, 1980, in Crisler Arena in Ann Arbor, Michigan, and lasting through the end of the year. After a three-week holiday break, a second leg continued with 26 shows through early March in Canada and the U.S.

The third leg of the tour, during April through June 1981 (and pushed back three weeks from the original schedule, due to Springsteen's exhaustion from the first two legs), represented Springsteen's first real foray into Western Europe, and his first appearances at all there since his very short venture there following the release of Born to Run in 1975. In total 34 shows were played, including six nights at London's Wembley Arena. Ten countries were visited: West Germany, Switzerland, France, Spain, Belgium, the Netherlands, Denmark, Sweden, Norway, and the United Kingdom.

The final leg was billed as a "homecoming tour", visiting U.S. cities that had been special in Springsteen's career for multiple-night stands, beginning with six nights that opened his native New Jersey's Meadowlands Arena.  After 34 shows in just 10 cities, this leg concluded on September 13 and 14 at Cincinnati's Riverfront Coliseum.

The show
For the only time in his career, Springsteen opened some concerts with his signature song, "Born to Run".  At the very first Ann Arbor show, he (in)famously was struck dumb and forgot the words to it; the audience's singing them helped him regain his bearings.  In that show's encore, local hero Bob Seger appeared to duet with Springsteen on "Thunder Road".

Springsteen's performances on this tour were similar in nature to tours before, but extended in length.  Thirty-song sets were often seen and shows ran up to four hours; it was during this tour that Springsteen's reputation for marathon performances really took hold.

The emotional temper of the concerts was assessed differently depending upon the goer, with some having a party and others reporting that after a string of depressing songs they felt like slitting their wrists.  Certainly The River had material to illustrate both viewpoints—on it Springsteen had acknowledged that "life had paradoxes, a lot of them, and you've got to live with them"—and the tour followed in kind. A key difference now was that where before Springsteen had relied upon old 1960s R&B and pop numbers for his concerts' uptempo, lighter moments, he now had written them himself: "Out in the Street" "I'm a Rocker," "Ramrod," "Cadillac Ranch," "Crush on You" and "You Can Look (But You Better Not Touch)" would serve this role in this tour and in tours for years to come.

A couple of Springsteen concert traditions began during the tour.  Near the end of the frat-rocker "Sherry Darling", Springsteen pulled a young female out of the front rows and danced with her on stage; this practice would become famous when he did it in the subsequent Born in the U.S.A. Tour during "Dancing in the Dark".  And when playing his new (and first) Top 10 hit "Hungry Heart", Springsteen let the audience sing the first verse and chorus, a ritual that would be solidified on subsequent tours as well.

Two shows were noted at the time for their confluence with historical events.  A November 5, 1980, show at Arizona State University followed the day after Ronald Reagan's electoral college landslide in the United States Presidential election.  In a rare move for the time, Springsteen pronounced, "I don't know what you guys think about what happened last night, but I think it's pretty frightening", after which he and the band launched into a particularly fiery rendition of "Badlands". The performance of the song, but not the preceding remark, was included in the Live/1975-85 box set, and the performance was later included in full on a video release of the show in 2015.  About a month later, on December 9, Springsteen went ahead with a scheduled concert at The Spectrum in Philadelphia the day after John Lennon was murdered, despite initial objections from sideman Steven Van Zandt. "It's a hard world that asks you to live with a lot of things that are unlivable", Springsteen announced before starting the show, "And it's hard to come out here and play tonight, but there's nothing else to do." He opened with an especially frenzied "Born to Run" and closed with a rendition of the Beatles' version of "Twist and Shout".

The most famous of the shows on the tour is probably the New Year's Eve 1980 concert at Nassau Coliseum on Long Island, New York.  With a set list 38 songs strong, it was one of the longest Springsteen shows of all time.

The first European show in Hamburg, West Germany, started out stiffly, but in time language and cultural barriers were broken and the European leg of the tour was considered a great success in building a Springsteen following there.  It concluded with two epic shows at Birmingham, England's NEC Arena, one of which featured the Who's Pete Townshend joining the encores.

Moreover, his time in these foreign countries exposed Springsteen to the world outside America, including talking to people who considered America a beacon of self-interest and greed, and gave him alternative views of societies and issues. He began to read books on American history, deepening his heretofore admittedly shallow political consciousness.

By the time the final leg of the tour took place back in the U.S., he was doing a benefit show for Vietnam Veterans of America in Los Angeles (which raised $100,000) and often singing a heartfelt acoustic version of Woody Guthrie's "This Land Is Your Land", presaging his much greater political involvement later in the 1980s. His on-stage stories and raps became longer and emotional, and he began asking for quiet before some of his more serious songs.  He added the dour death-of-Elvis "Bye Bye Johnny" (later retitled "Johnny Bye Bye") and obscure Jimmy Cliff descent "Trapped" to his repertoire.

The July 1981 Meadowlands shows, while lauded for opening the arena (New Jersey's first), were marred by their proximity to the American Fourth of July and the firecrackers that were set off in the crowd during every show of the stand. Springsteen hated them (and had once been hit in the face with one), and angrily denounced the fans doing it.

This was also the final E Street Band tour performed in the classic all-male lineup before Patti Scialfa joined the band permanently from the Born in the U.S.A. Tour onwards.

Songs performed

Critical and commercial reception
By now tickets were very hard to get for many Springsteen concerts.  As biographer Dave Marsh wrote, "Springsteen concert tickets sold out of all proportion to his popularity in the record stores or on Top Forty radio. He could sell out 20,000-seat sports arenas faster and more often than artists who sold four or five times as many records ... he was acclaimed as the greatest performer in rock."
Thus, ticket scalping was a constant problem, as was fraud in mail-order lottery sales.

Critic Robert Hilburn wrote that the album and "the extensive U.S. tour that immediately followed its release made Springsteen not just a critical but also popular favorite with rock & roll fans across the country. No longer was he seen as merely an East Coast critical phenomenon."  Music writer Robert Santelli wrote that, "Eager to please old fans and make disciples of new ones, Springsteen and the band pushed the limits nearly every night, with shows that went on for three—and sometimes four—hours. These marathon performances were exhausting for band and audience alike. The sheer number of songs played, the range of emotions explored, and the between-songs stories told by Springsteen ... took the shows far beyond the usual rock concert. Each night turned into a hard-driving demonstration of how and why Bruce Springsteen and the E Street Band had become the best rock act on the road."

Legacy
Of all Springsteen's tours, The River Tour is perhaps the least known in retrospect to people who were not there.  For many years, unlike tours before and since, there was little official audio or video documentation of it—no live radio broadcasts, no live album, no music videos made from concert footage, and no video releases.  The Live/1975-85 box set had thirteen selections from the tour, but they formed little thematic pattern.  Shows from the tour were of course bootlegged, but otherwise they are mostly lost to time.

The tour also suffers by comparison to the legendary 1978 Tour before it and the monumental Born in the U.S.A. Tour after it.  Perhaps its biggest legacy is the successful introduction of Springsteen's music and performance abilities across Western Europe.  Two decades later, much of Europe would boast a bigger and more vociferous fan base for Springsteen than anywhere in America.

In simultaneity with the box set, a new tour was announced, The River Tour 2016, which celebrated the original album's 35th anniversary and featured full front-to-back performances of The River during its initial leg. The tour kicked off in January 2016. The press release containing the announcement of the tour directly referred to the legacy of the original tour by stating that "[t]he original The River Tour began Oct. 3, 1980, two weeks before the release of Springsteen's fifth album, and continued through September 14, 1981. With sets that regularly approached the four-hour range, the 140-date international tour firmly established a reputation for Bruce Springsteen and the E Street Band as marathon performers."

Broadcasts and recordings
As previously mentioned, no River Tour shows were broadcast live, and for nearly three and a half decades after the tour's completion, the sole documentation of the tour came from the Live/1975-85 box set's selections.

Partial video of the November 5, 1980, show in Tempe was released as part of The Ties That Bind: The River Collection, and audio of the missing songs was released through the Bruce Springsteen Archives as a free download on December 24, 2015.

Several shows have since been released as part of the Bruce Springsteen Archives:
Nassau Coliseum, New York 1980, released March 25, 2015, and re-mixed and re-released on July 5, 2019.
Wembley Arena, June 5, 1981, released August 3, 2018.
Nassau Coliseum, New York 12/29/80, released July 5, 2019.
Brendan Byrne Arena, July 9, 1981 released May 1, 2020.
Nassau Coliseum, Dec 28, 1980, released December 3, 2021
London, June 4, 1981,released June 3, 2022

Personnel
 Bruce Springsteen – lead vocals, guitars, harmonica
 Roy Bittan – piano, background vocals
 Clarence Clemons – saxophone, percussion, background vocals
 Danny Federici – organ, glockenspiel, background vocals
 Garry Tallent – bass guitar
 Steven Van Zandt – guitars, background vocals
 Max Weinberg – drums

Tour dates

Sources
 Fred Schruers, "Bruce Springsteen and the Secret of the World", Rolling Stone, February 5, 1981.
 Born in the U.S.A. Tour (tour booklet, 1984), Springsteen chronology.
 Hilburn, Robert.  Springsteen.  Rolling Stone Press, 1985.  .
 Marsh, Dave.  Glory Days: Bruce Springsteen in the 1980s.  Pantheon Books, 1987.  .
 Santelli, Robert.  Greetings From E Street: The Story of Bruce Springsteen and the E Street Band.  Chronicle Books, 2006.  .
 Killing Floor's concert database gives valuable coverage as well, but also does not support direct linking to individual dates.
 Brucebase's concert descriptions even more valuable coverage
 Setlists statistics page, for River Tour retrieval queries

Bruce Springsteen concert tours
1980 concert tours
1981 concert tours